Umarpada is a village located in Surat district, Gujarat, western India.

It is also a railway station under Western Railway zone of Indian Railways. Station code is UMPD.

It as also the seat of Umarpada taluka in Surat district.

References 

Villages in Surat district